Eduardo Alberto Cisternas Gómez (born 10 January 2004) is a Chilean swimmer. He competed in the 2020 Summer Olympics. In the heats for the 400 metre freestyle, he broke his own national record that he had set at the 2021 South American Championships.

References

External links

2004 births
Living people
Swimmers at the 2020 Summer Olympics
Chilean male freestyle swimmers
Olympic swimmers of Chile
21st-century Chilean people